Acrepidopterum is a genus of beetles in the family Cerambycidae, containing the following species:

 Acrepidopterum acutum Zayas, 1975
 Acrepidopterum capilosum Martins & Galileo, 2008
 Acrepidopterum jamaicensis Fisher, 1942
 Acrepidopterum minutum Fisher, 1926
 Acrepidopterum pilosum Fisher, 1932
 Acrepidopterum reseri Vitali, 2002

References

Apomecynini